In enzymology, a gluconate 5-dehydrogenase is an enzyme that catalyzes the chemical reaction

D-gluconate + NAD(P)+  5-dehydro-D-gluconate + NAD(P)H + H+

The 3 substrates of this enzyme are D-gluconate, NAD+, and NADP+, whereas its 4 products are 5-dehydro-D-gluconate, NADH, NADPH, and H+.

This enzyme belongs to the family of oxidoreductases, specifically those acting on the CH-OH group of donor with NAD+ or NADP+ as acceptor. The systematic name of this enzyme class is D-gluconate:NAD(P)+ 5-oxidoreductase. Other names in common use include 5-keto-D-gluconate 5-reductase, 5-keto-D-gluconate 5-reductase, 5-ketogluconate 5-reductase, 5-ketogluconate reductase, and 5-keto-D-gluconate reductase.

Structural studies

As of late 2007, only one structure has been solved for this class of enzymes, with the PDB accession code .

References

 
 
 

EC 1.1.1
NADPH-dependent enzymes
NADH-dependent enzymes
Enzymes of known structure